Gyurov is a Bulgarian masculine surname, its feminine counterpart is Gyurova. It may refer to
Ginka Gyurova (born 1954), Bulgarian rower 
Krasimira Gyurova (1953–2011), Bulgarian basketball player
Spas Gyurov, Bulgarian road bicycle racer

See also
Gurov
Gjurov

Bulgarian-language surnames